State Route 152 (SR 152) is a primary state highway in the U.S. state of Virginia.  The state highway runs  from U.S. Route 60 (US 60) in Newport News east to US 258 and SR 134 in Hampton. Although running primarily from west to east, it is signed south to north.

Route description

SR 152 begins at an intersection with US 60 (Warwick Boulevard) in the Hilton Village neighborhood of the independent city of Newport News.  The state highway heads east as Main Street, a four-lane undivided highway that passes under CSX's Peninsula Subdivision and intersects US 17 and SR 143 (Jefferson Avenue).  SR 152 continues northeast through a residential area to Newmarket Creek, where the highway crosses into the city of Hampton.  The state highway continues east as Todds Lane, which intersects the north–south thoroughfares Big Bethel Road and Hunt Club Boulevard.  When Todds Lane veers southeast, SR 152 continues as Cunningham Drive, a four-lane divided highway.  Just before passing over Interstate 64 (I-64) with no access, the westbound direction receives a ramp from southbound SR 134, which runs concurrently with I-64 for a short distance north of the Interstate's junction with US 258.  SR 152 passes along the north side of Peninsula Town Center and intersects Coliseum Drive, where the highway becomes undivided again.  The state highway curves south to reach its eastern terminus at US 258 and SR 134 (Mercury Boulevard).

Major intersections

References

External links

Virginia Highways Project: VA 152

152
State Route 152
State Route 152